KIH may refer to:

Kish International Airport, on Kish Island, Iran, Persian Gulf
House of Yi (Korean Imperial Household), a Korean clan
KIH Medal or Empress of India Medal, a commemorative medal awarded to mark the occasion of the proclamation of Queen Victoria as Empress of India in 1877
Kaisar-i-Hind Medal, a medal awarded by the Emperor or Empress of India between 1900 and 1947 for public service